Cyperus michoacanensis is a species of sedge that is native to south western parts of Mexico.

See also 
 List of Cyperus species

References 

michoacanensis
Plants described in 1908
Flora of Mexico
Taxa named by Nathaniel Lord Britton